Muckross House is located on the small Muckross Peninsula between Muckross Lake and Lough Leane, two of the lakes of Killarney,  from the town of Killarney in County Kerry, Ireland. In 1932 it was presented by William Bowers Bourn and Arthur Rose Vincent to the Irish nation. It thus became the first National Park in the Irish Free State (now Republic of Ireland) and formed the basis of the present day Killarney National Park.

History

With sixty-five rooms, it was built in the Tudor style. Extensive improvements were undertaken in the 1850s in preparation for the visit of Queen Victoria in 1861. It is said that these improvements for the Queen's visit were a contributory factor in the financial difficulties suffered by the Herbert family which resulted in the sale of the estate. In 1899 it was bought by Arthur Guinness, 1st Baron Ardilaun who wanted to preserve the dramatic landscape. He did not live in the house himself, but rented it out to wealthy groups as a hunting lodge.

In August 1911, not long before the First World War, Muckross House and its demesne were again sold to William Bowers Bourn, a wealthy Californian mining magnate. He and his wife passed it to their daughter Maud and her husband Arthur Rose Vincent as a wedding present. The couple lived there until Maud's death from pneumonia in 1929. 

In 1932 her parents Mr and Mrs Bourn and their son-in-law Arthur Vincent decided to present Muckross House and its 11,000 acre estate to the Irish nation. Being called the ″Bourn-Vincent Memorial Park″, it thus became the first National Park in the Republic of Ireland and formed the basis of present-day Killarney National Park.  In later years the park was substantially expanded by the acquisition of land from the former Earl of Kenmare's estate.

Description of Muckross House

The interior

The front entryway has a plethora of mounted trophy heads, including an enormous rack of antlers from the Irish Elk (extinct), found preserved in a local bog.

See also
Muckross Abbey

External links

 

Buildings and structures in County Kerry
Museums in County Kerry
Historic house museums in the Republic of Ireland
Farm museums in the Republic of Ireland
Gardens in County Kerry
Killarney
Open-air museums in the Republic of Ireland
Tudor Revival architecture
1843 establishments in Ireland